The 2014–15 Metal Ligaen season was the 24th season in the Danish Hockey League since the team was promoted in 1990. The team has completed 26 transfers, 13 in and 13 out. They have furthermore got a new General Manager, Brad Gratton, who switched from the league rivals from Rødovre Mighty Bulls.

Bulldogs finished as number 4 in the general classification, after a long period sitting in first place. They got knockout out in the quarter-finals by Esbjerg Energy.

Regular season

League table

Sport in Odense